Faccione is a 1991 Italian comedy film directed by Christian De Sica.

Cast

References

External links

1991 films
Films directed by Christian De Sica
1990s Italian-language films
1991 comedy films
Italian comedy films
1990s Italian films